Martin Svoboda (born 2 January 1975) is a Czech football goalkeeper who currently plays for FK Litvínov.

In July 2008, Svoboda transferred from Most to Czech 2. Liga side FK Dukla Prague.

References

External links
 Profile at Vysočina Jihlava website

1975 births
Living people
Czech footballers
Association football goalkeepers
Czech First League players
FC Hradec Králové players
FK Baník Most players
FK Chmel Blšany players
FK Dukla Prague players
FC Vysočina Jihlava players